Siegfried Reich (born 29 September 1959) is a German former professional footballer who played as a striker.

The prolific goalscorer ended his career one year before Wolfsburg's first top flight promotion in 1997.

Honours 
 DFB-Pokal finalist: 1994–95
 2. Bundesliga top scorer: 1987 (26 goals), 1993 (27 goals)

Links

References 

1959 births
Living people
People from Wolfsburg
Association football forwards
Footballers from Lower Saxony
German footballers
Borussia Mönchengladbach players
Borussia Dortmund players
Arminia Bielefeld players
Hannover 96 players
KFC Uerdingen 05 players
VfL Wolfsburg players
Bundesliga players
2. Bundesliga players
West German footballers